Hui Lei is a Chinese-American Computer Scientist and Software Engineer. He is known for his work in cloud computing, big data, and mobile computing. He is a Fellow of the Institute of Electrical and Electronics Engineers (IEEE) and a Vice President at Futurewei Technologies.

Education
Lei received a B.S. degree from Sun Yat-sen University, an M.S. degree from New York University, and a Ph.D. degree from Columbia University, all in computer science.
His Ph.D. thesis was titled "Uncovering and Exploiting the Intrinsic Correlations Between File References".

Career
Prior to joining Futurewei Technologies, Lei held various positions at IBM, including Senior Manager of Cloud Platform Technologies at the Thomas J. Watson Research Center, Chief Technology Officer of Watson Health Cloud, IBM Distinguished Engineer, and IBM Master Inventor.

The projects Lei has worked on include R3 Messaging, Mercury, and Mobile Crowdsensing. He has over 90 patents to his credit.

Lei has been offered honorary appointments as visiting professor or adjunct professor at Sun Yat-sen University, Hong Kong Polytechnic University, Huazhong University of Science and Technology, and Hong Kong University of Science and Technology.

Lei is a past editor-in-chief of the IEEE Transactions on Cloud Computing.

Honors and awards
Lei was recognized with an IEEE Computer Society T. Michael Elliott Distinguished Service Certificate in 2014. He was admitted to the IEEE Computer Society Golden Core in the same year. He was named a Fellow of the IEEE in 2016 "for contributions to scalable and dependable data access in distributed computing systems." He received an IEEE Computer Society Technical Achievement Award in 2017 "for pioneering contributions to scalable access to real-world data."

References 

Fellow Members of the IEEE
Computer scientists
Software engineers
New York University alumni
American computer scientists
Columbia University alumni
IBM employees
IBM Research computer scientists